The U.S. Virgin Islands Soccer Association is the governing body of soccer in the United States Virgin Islands. The USVISA controls the US Virgin Islands Championship.

The Federation was founded in 1987 and became affiliated with CONCACAF the same year. It joined FIFA in 1998.  The Federation's headquarters are located in Christiansted on Saint Croix island.

Association staff

References

External links
 
 United States Virgin Islands on FIFA website
 United States Virgin Islands at CONCACAF site

CONCACAF member associations
Soccer in the United States Virgin Islands
Sports governing bodies in the United States Virgin Islands
Sports organizations established in 1987
1987 establishments in the United States Virgin Islands